The Bourbeuse River (French for 'muddy') is a river located in east-central Missouri, in the Ozarks region, and is one of two major tributaries of the Meramec River, the other being the Big River. The Bourbeuse flows to the northeast from its source near the locale of Dillon just northeast of Rolla in Phelps County, through Maries, Gasconade, Crawford, and Franklin counties, where it discharges into the Meramec River near Moselle.

Tributaries of the Bourbeuse River include Boone Creek, Brush Creek, Dry Fork, Little Bourbeuse River, Red Oak Creek, Spring Creek and Voss Creek.

See also
List of Missouri rivers

References

External links

Bourbeus River canoeing information
More Bourbeus River canoeing information
Bourbeus River flood stage information
Bourbeuse River Watershed Inventory and Assessment, Missouri Department of Conservation

Rivers of Missouri
Tributaries of the Meramec River
Rivers of Phelps County, Missouri
Rivers of Maries County, Missouri
Rivers of Gasconade County, Missouri
Rivers of Crawford County, Missouri
Rivers of Franklin County, Missouri